The Inter State Women's Competition was as Indian women's cricket first-class domestic competition organised by the Board of Control for Cricket in India. The competition took place twice, in 2007–08 and 2008–09, with teams competing in two-day matches across five zonal divisions before a knockout stage. Railways were the most successful team in the competition, winning both tournaments.

The tournament ran alongside the Senior Women's One Day League in 2007–08 and both the One Day League and the Senior Women's T20 League in 2008–09, before the tournament was discontinued in favour of the other two formats. Women's first-class cricket was revived in India in 2014–15, with the Senior Women's Cricket Inter Zonal Three Day Game.

Competition format
Teams in the Inter State Women's Competition were divided into five zonal groups, playing each other once in a round-robin format. The top two in each group progressed to the knockout stages. The top team from each group, and the best second-placed team, progressed straight to the quarter-finals whilst the other four second-placed teams played-off in the pre-quarter finals.

Matches were played using a two-day format, with the first innings limited to 90 overs per side. 5 points were awarded for a win, and 3 points awarded for a first innings lead in a drawn match. In the knockout stages, if a match was drawn the side that lead on first innings progressed to the next stage.

Teams

Seasons

2007–08
The tournament began in the 2007–08 season, taking place from 10 September to 2 December 2007. Railways were the inaugural winners of the tournament, beating Maharashtra in the final on first innings lead. The knockout stages were as follows:

2008–09
The second edition of the tournament took place from 1 January to 14 February 2009. Railways retained their title, beating Madhya Pradesh in the final on first innings lead. The knockout stages were as follows:

Tournament results

Notes

References

Recurring sporting events established in 2007
First-class cricket competitions
Indian domestic cricket competitions